New Music Download was a fortnightly podcast presented by Tom Ravenscroft for Channel 4 Radio.  It ran between January and June 2008, replacing the Slashmusic podcast that ran from August 2006 to June 2007.  It was produced by Hermeet Chadhar.

Music

Sessions
The following sessions were recorded for the programme:

Notes and references

External links
New Music Download at Channel 4 Radio - Download the Show
New Music Download - Blog, Tracklistings and Gallery
Slashmusic at Channel 4 Radio
New Music Download at MySpace

British music radio programmes